Pristimantis ernesti is a species of frog in the family Strabomantidae. It is endemic to the summit of Sumaco, a volcano in the Napo Province, Ecuador. Its common name is Ernest's robber frog. It is named after Dr. Ernst Williams, a friend and colleague of the scientist that described the species. It is a little studied species.

Description
Female size is unknown. The dorsum is coffee-coloured with dark gray markings, including a "W" mark on its upper back. Dorsal skin is glandular with prominent dorsolateral ridges.

Habitat and conservation
Its natural habitat is grassland and bushland on the summit of Sumaco. The volcano is in the Sumaco Napo-Galeras National Park. Nevertheless, being restricted to a single location, the population is vulnerable stochastic processes.

References

ernesti
Endemic fauna of Ecuador
Amphibians of Ecuador
Amphibians described in 1987
Taxonomy articles created by Polbot